Paul O'Grady on the Wireless (billed as Paul O'Grady and referred to on-air as TeamPOG or TeamPOGradio) is the incarnation of the Sunday teatime slot on BBC Radio 2 that aired from 5 April 2009 to 14 August 2022, hosted by Paul O'Grady. The show is produced by Malcolm Prince, who also makes regular contributions to the programme, and it regularly attracted over two million listeners. It was broadcast on Sundays between 5pm and 7pm. The show returned for its 2022 Christmas Day special on Boom Radio. 

From its inception until 13 February 2022, the show was broadcast every Sunday. On 2 February 2022, it was announced that BBC management had decided to reduce the number of shows per year from 40 to 26 and that O'Grady would take a break for three months, with the replacement programme hosted by Rob Beckett. O’Grady returned on 22 May 2022 for a new series of thirteen shows which ran until mid-August. He continued to broadcast from his home. However, on 9 August 2022, it was announced that O'Grady would be leaving the network after 14 years and that the final show of the current series, the 546th edition, would be the last to air on Radio 2, on Sunday 14 August. His producer Prince also left the BBC. 

On 21 November 2022, Prince announced that he and O'Grady would return to host the annual Christmas Day special on Boom Radio, with O'Grady broadcasting from home.

The show marked O'Grady's permanent role as a Radio 2 presenter, following numerous stints standing in on other shows including Elaine Paige on Sunday.

The programme celebrated its 200th show on 24 February 2013, its 300th show on 17 May 2015, its 400th show on 11 February 2018, and its 500th show on 28 March 2021. It celebrated its 10th birthday on 7 April 2019.

The programme was off-air from March to June 2020 due to the COVID-19 pandemic. It then aired a series of compilation shows, before returning for new pre-recorded shows on 9 August 2020, with O'Grady presenting from his home, rather than in the studio. On 11 April 2021 his show was cancelled for the first time due to Prince Philip, Duke of Edinburgh's death.   

The series was never actually billed as Paul O'Grady on the Wireless - in The Radio Times, it was simply listed as Paul O'Grady.

Background 
O'Grady confirmed in 2008 that he would be getting his own show on BBC Radio 2 and no longer covering for presenters on other programmes.

Format
The show aired from 5 to 7:00 pm on Sundays and was often pre-recorded during the preceding week, although it had occasionally been broadcast live. The show's format consisted of a series of tracks intertwined with emails and messages from listeners, and regular features such as:
 
All-Star Triple – Three tracks, played in a row, from the same artist. This first replaced the Motown Triple in the second hour of the programme from October 2010. However, at the end of the year, the 'All Star Triple' replaced both the Northern Soul and Motown Triples and features in both hours.
Thank You – A chance for listeners to say 'Thank You' to people that have made a positive difference to their lives. Each Thank You message read out by Paul on-air received a 'Certificate of Thanks', signed by Paul and the best letter or email of the week, as chosen by Paul, received a box of chocolates and a T-shirt.
Cocktail Hour – An easy-listening track accompanied by a cocktail recommendation in the first hour of the programme.
Lost TV Theme- Each week, in the second hour of the programme, Paul played a 'lost' TV Theme Tune from an old television programme in full, as well as providing some background information about the programme.
Wish You Were There – In the second hour of the programme, Paul played a relaxing piece of music, designed to 'whisk you away to your own piece of paradise'. 'Wish You Were There' did not feature in every edition of the programme.
Hi-NRG Classic- Occasionally, Paul featured a 'Hi-NRG Classic' as part of his playlist.
Dead Pets – Listeners were invited to pay tribute to their deceased pets. Paul read out these letters or emails to Just a Closer Walk With Thee.
Lost Shops Or Pubs – Listeners were invited to write or email to the show to inquire give information about their favourite 'lost' shops or pubs.
Lost Film – Occasionally, towards the end of the show, Paul read out a 'Lost Film' inquiry that had been sent by a listener who wanted to know the name of a particular film that they have seen but cannot remember. This film was revisited during a future programme, where listeners' responses were read out.
Lost Friends – Listeners were invited to email the show if they wished to get in touch with a person that they had lost contact with.
It's a Small World – Whenever Paul read out a letter from a listener not based in the UK, an extract from the song it's a small world (the title song to Disney's series of theme park rides) was played by producer Malcolm Prince. Paul acted disgusted and tried to ruin the clip as much as possible, as he apparently dislikes the song.
A blast from our Eurovision past – Paul played a past Eurovision winning song in the second hour of the show.
Classy Classical Choice – Paul played a classical music track in the second hour of the show.
Northern Soul Triple – In the first hour of the programme, three Northern Soul tracks were played in a row. This feature was axed at the end of 2010 and had been replaced with the 'All Star Triple'. From January 2011, each week Paul featured a Northern Soul track and a Motown track in his playlist, for any listeners who were missing the extinct triples.
Motown Triple – In the second hour of the programme, three Motown tracks were played in a row. This feature was axed at the beginning of September 2010 and was replaced with what was then the new 'All Star Triple'.
Competition – In the first few months of the programme, listener's were invited to enter a light-hearted monthly competition. The first competition was entitled "Tea For Two on 2" and ran in April, May, June and July 2009. In the first round, the winner was given the opportunity to have tea with Paul and the team at the studios. In the other three months, the winner would receive a luxury hamper filled with tea, scones, biscuits and cakes, or could have tea with Paul and the team as the 'booby prize'. The second competition was entitled "Pressing Paul" and ran in August, September and October 2009. In each of these months, a listener could win the opportunity to have their washing and ironing taken care of by the show, in order to give themselves a break on a Sunday. Paul did not take any of the competitions seriously at all, encouraging people "Please don't enter" and "You could win a luxury hamper filled with tea, scones, jams, biscuits, cakes and trifles...or you could opt for the booby prize and join me and the team for tea in the green room!". The competition feature was 'rested' after the October 2009 competition, but did not return.

Stand-in presenters
Bill Kenwright (2009)
Richard Allinson (2009)
Jodie Prenger (2010–2012)
Martine McCutcheon (2014)
Len Goodman (2013–18)
Nicki Chapman (2016)
Alan Carr & Melanie Sykes (2017–20)
Christopher Biggins (2017)
Richard Madeley (2018)
Gaby Roslin (2018)
Matt Lucas (2019)
Paddy O'Connell (2020–21)
Patrick Kielty (2021)

Special editions
On 14 November 2010, BBC Radio 2 hosted its annual 'Children in Need Music Marathon'. O'Grady was joined by Jodie Prenger in the studio from 16:00–19:00 on this day, as they took listener's requests, pledges and donations.

On 6 November 2011, the second hour of the show was dedicated to an interview with Susan Boyle.

On 13 November 2011, BBC Radio 2 hosted its 'Children in Need Jukebox'. Paul presented the final two hours of the Jukebox, between 17:00 and 19:00. He was joined in the studio by Jane McDonald in the first hour and Nicki Chapman in the second hour, as they took listener's requests, pledges and donations.

The show had a lunchtime slot on Christmas Day from 2009 to 2017 and again from 2019 to 2021, plus Paul had presented his own Christmas Day show in 2008 before his regular show began. The Christmas Day show returned in 2022 on Boom Radio.

See also
Elaine Paige on Sunday
Weekend Wogan

References

External links
 

BBC Radio 2 programmes
2009 radio programme debuts
Paul O'Grady